Two human polls comprised the 1962 NCAA University Division football rankings. Unlike most sports, college football's governing body, the NCAA, does not bestow a national championship, instead that title is bestowed by one or more different polling agencies. There are two main weekly polls that begin in the preseason—the AP Poll and the Coaches Poll.

Legend

AP Poll
The final AP Poll was released on December 4, at the end of the 1962 regular season, weeks before the bowls. The poll ranked only the top ten teams from 1962 through 1967.

Final Coaches Poll
The final UPI Coaches Poll was released prior to the bowl games, on USC received 31 of the 35 first-place votes; Wisconsin received two, Ole Miss one, and Texas one.

 Prior to the 1975 season, the Big Ten and AAWU (later Pac-8) conferences allowed only one postseason participant each, for the Rose Bowl.

References

College football rankings